Lightyear Capital is a private equity firm focused on leveraged buyout and growth capital investments in financial services companies.

The firm, which is based in New York City, was founded in 2002 with the backing of UBS AG by Donald Marron. Marron is best known for building up PaineWebber over a 23-year career and completing its sale to UBS AG in late 2000 for $10.8 Billion. Marron was also a founder of Data Resources Inc.

The firm has raised approximately $3 billion since inception across its five funds. In May 2002, Lightyear closed on its first fund, The Lightyear Fund, with $750 million of investor commitments, approximately $500 million of which came from UBS AG. In 2006, the firm completed fundraising for its second private equity fund, with $850 million of commitments from over 40 investors. In March 2021, the firm filed documents stating that it had raised over $1.27 billion with 24 investors for its fifth fund, Lightyear Capital V.

Among the firm's most notable investments are Collegiate Funding Services (acquired by JPMorgan Chase), ARGUS Software, Higher One, NAU Country Insurance Company (the nation's third largest crop insurer), Antares Holdings, New Flyer Industries, and Goldleaf Financial Solutions.

In 2013, Atlanta, divested its RidgeWorth Investments to Lightyear Capital LLC for up to $265 million.

In May 2019, Lightyear Capital acquired a controlling stake in Lighthouse Technologies Holdings Corporation.

In September 2021, Lightyear Capital acquired assets and partnered with Schellman & Company, LLC for the delivery of Information Technology and cybersecurity compliance services.

References

External links

Lightyear Capital (company website)

Private equity firms of the United States
Investment banking private equity groups
UBS
Financial services companies established in 2002
Companies based in New York City
2002 establishments in New York City